The North Hollywood shootout was a confrontation between two heavily armed and armored bank robbers, Larry Phillips Jr. and Emil Mătăsăreanu, and members of the Los Angeles Police Department (LAPD) in the North Hollywood district of Los Angeles, California, United States on February 28, 1997. Both robbers were killed, twelve police officers and eight civilians were injured, and numerous vehicles and other property were damaged or destroyed by the nearly 2,000 rounds of ammunition fired by the robbers and police.

At 9:16 a.m., Phillips and Mătăsăreanu entered and robbed Bank of America's North Hollywood branch. The two robbers were confronted by LAPD officers when they exited the bank and a shootout between the officers and robbers ensued. The robbers attempted to flee the scene, Phillips on foot and Mătăsăreanu in their getaway vehicle, while continuing to exchange fire with the officers. The shootout continued onto a residential street adjacent to the bank until Phillips, mortally wounded, succumbed to a self-inflicted gunshot wound; Mătăsăreanu was incapacitated by officers three blocks away and subsequently bled to death before the arrival of paramedics more than an hour later.

Phillips and Mătăsăreanu had robbed at least two other banks using similar methods for entry past "bullet-proof" security doors, taking control of the entire bank, and firing weapons illegally modified to enable fully automatic fire. They were also suspects in two armored car robberies.

Standard issue sidearms carried by most local patrol officers at the time were 9mm pistols or .38 Special revolvers; some patrol cars were also equipped with a 12-gauge shotgun. Phillips and Mătăsăreanu carried Norinco Type 56 rifles (a Chinese AK-47 variant), a Bushmaster XM-15 Dissipator with a 100-round drum magazine, and a Heckler & Koch HK91 rifle, all of which, except for the HK91, had been illegally modified to be select-fire capable, as well as a Beretta 92FS pistol. The robbers wore homemade body armor which successfully protected them from handgun rounds and shotgun pellets fired by the responding officers. A law enforcement SWAT team eventually arrived with higher-caliber weapons, but they had little effect on the heavy body armor used by the two perpetrators. The SWAT team also commandeered an armored car to evacuate the wounded. Several officers additionally equipped themselves with AR-15s and other semi-automatic rifles from a nearby firearms dealer. The incident sparked debate on the need for patrol officers to upgrade their firepower in preparation for similar situations in the future.

Due to the large number of injuries and rounds fired, equipment used by the robbers, and overall length of the shootout, it is regarded as one of the most intense and significant gun battles in U.S. police history. Combined, the two men had fired approximately 1,100 rounds in total, while approximately 650 rounds were fired by police. Another estimate is that a total of nearly 2,000 rounds were fired collectively.

Backgrounds

Larry Eugene Phillips Jr. (born September 20, 1970) and Decebal Ștefan Emilian "Emil" Mătăsăreanu (born July 19, 1966) first met at a Gold's Gym in Venice, Los Angeles, California, in 1989. Phillips ( tall and ) and Mătăsăreanu ( tall and ) had mutual interests in weightlifting, bodybuilding, and firearms. Before meeting, Phillips was a habitual offender, responsible for multiple real estate scams and counts of shoplifting. Mătăsăreanu, born in Timișoara, Romania to parents who relocated to Los Angeles in 1974, was a qualified electrical engineer and ran a relatively unsuccessful computer repair business.

On July 20, 1993, Phillips and Mătăsăreanu robbed an armored car outside a branch of FirstBank in Littleton, Colorado.

On October 29, they were arrested in Glendale, northeast of Los Angeles, for operating a stolen vehicle. A subsequent search of their vehicle—after Phillips surrendered with a concealed weapon—found two semi-automatic rifles, two handguns, more than 1,600 rounds of 7.62×39mm rifle ammunition, 1,200 rounds of 9×19mm Parabellum and .45 ACP handgun ammunition, radio scanners, smoke bombs, improvised explosive devices, body armor vests, and three different California license plates. Initially charged with conspiracy to commit robbery, both served 100 days in jail and were placed on three years of probation due to plea bargaining. After their release, most of their seized property was returned to them, except for the confiscated firearms and explosives.

On June 14, 1995, Phillips and Mătăsăreanu ambushed a Brink's armored car in Winnetka, Los Angeles, killing one guard, Herman Cook, and seriously wounding another. In May 1996, they robbed two branches of Bank of America in the San Fernando Valley area of Los Angeles, stealing approximately US$1.5 million. The pair were dubbed the "High Incident Bandits" by investigators due to the weaponry they had used in three robberies prior to their attempt in North Hollywood.

The robbery

Preparation

On the morning of February 28, 1997, after months of preparation that included extensive reconnoitering of their intended target—the Bank of America branch located at 6600 Laurel Canyon Boulevard—Phillips and Mătăsăreanu armed themselves with a semi-automatic HK-91 and several illegally converted weapons: two Norinco Type 56 S rifles, a fully automatic Norinco Type56 S-1, and a fully automatic Bushmaster XM15 Dissipator.

The robbers allegedly filled a jam jar with gasoline and placed it in the back seat with the intention of setting the car and weapons on fire to destroy evidence after the robbery. Mătăsăreanu wore only a Type IIIA bulletproof vest, but included a metal ballistic plate to protect vital organs. Additionally, each man had a watch sewn onto the back of one glove, in order to monitor their timing. Before entering, they took the barbiturate phenobarbital, prescribed to Mătăsăreanu as a sedative, to calm their nerves. The Forensic Toxicology Laboratory of the Coroner's Office later also found ephedrine and phenylpropanolamine in Phillips' blood, and phenytoin in Mătăsăreanu's blood.

Bank robbery
Phillips and Mătăsăreanu, driving a white 1987 Chevrolet Celebrity, arrived at the Bank of America branch at the intersection of Laurel Canyon Boulevard and Archwood Street in North Hollywood around 9:16 a.m., and set their watch alarms for eight minutes, the police response time they had estimated. To come up with this timeframe, Phillips had used a radio scanner to monitor police transmissions prior to the robbery. As the two were walking in, they were spotted by two LAPD officers, Loren Farell and Martin Perello, who were driving down Laurel Canyon in a patrol car. Officer Farell issued a call on the radio: "15-A-43, requesting assistance, we have a possible 211 in progress at the Bank of America." 211 is the code for robbery.

As they entered the bank, each armed with a Norinco Type 56 S-1 rifle, Phillips and Mătăsăreanu forced a customer leaving the ATM lobby near the entrance into the bank and onto the floor. A security guard inside saw the scuffle and the heavily armed robbers and radioed his partner in the parking lot to call the police; the call was not received. Phillips shouted, "This is a fucking hold-up!" before he and Mătăsăreanu opened fire into the ceiling in an attempt to scare the approximately thirty bank staff and customers and to discourage resistance.

Mătăsăreanu shot open the bulletproof door (which was designed to resist only low-velocity rounds) and gained access to the tellers and vault. The robbers forced assistant manager John Villigrana to open the vault. Villigrana obliged and began to fill the robbers' money bag. However, due to a change in the bank's delivery schedule, the vault contained significantly less than the $750,000 the gunmen had expected.

Mătăsăreanu, enraged at this development, argued with Villigrana and demanded more. In an apparent show of frustration, Mătăsăreanu then fired a full drum magazine of 75 rounds into the bank's safe, destroying much of the remaining money. He then attempted to open the bank's ATM, but due to a change in policies, the branch manager no longer had access to the money inside. Before leaving, the robbers locked the hostages in the bank vault. In the end, the two left with $303,305 and three dye packs which later exploded, ruining the money they stole.

Shootout

Outside, the first-responding officers heard the gunfire within the bank and made another radio call reporting "shots fired" before taking cover behind their patrol car. While the robbers were still inside, additional North Hollywood division patrol and detective units arrived and took strategic positions at all four corners of the bank, establishing a perimeter around it. In the initial shooting, Phillips wounded Sgt. Dean Haynes, Officers Martin Whitfield, James Zaboravan, and Stuart Guy, and Detectives William Krulac and Tracey Angeles, as well as three civilians that had taken cover behind Sgt. Haynes' patrol car. Phillips also fired at an LAPD helicopter flown by Charles D. Perriguey Jr. as it surveyed the scene from above, forcing it to withdraw to a safer distance. Phillips briefly retreated inside, then reemerged through the north doorway, while Mătăsăreanu exited through the south exit.

Phillips and Mătăsăreanu continued to engage the officers, firing sporadic bursts into the patrol cars that had been positioned on Laurel Canyon in front of the bank and in the parking lot across the street.
Officers, who were mostly armed with then-LAPD standard-issue Beretta 92F/FS 9mm pistols, Smith & Wesson Model 15 .38 Special revolvers, and 12-gauge Ithaca Model 37 pump-action shotguns, continued to return fire at both robbers, but found quickly that their handguns and shotguns would not penetrate the body armor worn by Phillips and Mătăsăreanu. This was compounded by the fact that most of the LAPD officers' service pistols had insufficient range at longer distances, where most officers found themselves positioned relative to the bank entrance. An officer was heard on the LAPD police frequency approximately 10 to 15 minutes into the shootout, warning other officers that they should "not stop [the getaway vehicle], they've got automatic weapons, there's nothing we have that can stop them." Additionally, the officers were pinned down by the heavy sprays of gunfire coming from the robbers, making it extremely difficult to attempt a head shot with their handguns. Several officers acquired five AR-15-style rifles from a nearby gun store to combat the robbers.

Two locations adjacent to the bank's north parking lot provided good cover for officers and detectives. Police likely shot Phillips with their handguns while Phillips was still firing and taking cover near the four vehicles adjacent to the North wall of the bank (gray Honda Civic, Ford Explorer, white Acura Legend, and Chevrolet Celebrity). One location that Officer Richard Zielenski of Valley Traffic Division effectively used for cover was the adjacent Del Taco restaurant's west wall,  from Phillips. Zielenski fired 86 9mm rounds at Phillips and is believed have hit Phillips during their exchange. Zielenski was also able to use this position to draw Phillips' fire away from Sgt. Haynes and Officer Whitfield, who were both wounded and had only marginal cover behind trees across Laurel Canyon Blvd. The other location that proved advantageous for the LAPD was the backyard of 6641 Agnes Avenue. A cinder block wall provided relative cover for several detectives shooting at Phillips with their 9mm pistols. After Mătăsăreanu backed the Chevrolet Celebrity out of the handicapped space in the north parking lot, Phillips received a gunshot wound to his left wrist, based upon helicopter news footage that showed him react to pain.

At the same approximate time, LAPD gunfire struck the Heckler & Koch rifle that Phillips was firing, rendering it inoperable with a penetration to the receiver. Phillips discarded it and rearmed himself with another assault rifle from the trunk of the sedan.

Arrival of SWAT team
After LAPD radio operators received the second "officer down" call from police at the shootout, a tactical alert was issued. The SWAT team (Donnie Anderson, Steve Gomez, Peter Weireter, and Richard Massa) arrived 18 minutes after the shooting had begun. They were armed with AR-15s, and wore running shoes and shorts under their body armor, as they had been on an exercise run when they received the call. Upon arrival, they commandeered a nearby armored truck, which was used to extract wounded civilians and officers from the scene.

Deaths of the gunmen

While still in the parking lot, Mătăsăreanu was shot in the right buttock, the right leg, and the left forearm. A fourth projectile then lacerated his upper right eyesocket and prompted him to duck behind the hood of the getaway car in shock; he subsequently abandoned his duffle bag of money, entered the getaway vehicle, and started the engine. Phillips retrieved the HK-91 from the open trunk and continued firing upon officers while walking alongside the sedan, using it for cover. As Phillips approached the passenger's side of the getaway vehicle, he was hit in the shoulder and his rifle was struck in the receiver and magazine by bullets fired by police. After firing a few more shots with one arm, Phillips discarded the HK-91 and retrieved the Norinco Type 56 before exiting the parking lot and retreating onto the street while Mătăsăreanu drove down the road.

At 9:52 a.m., Phillips turned east on Archwood Street and took cover behind a parked semi-truck where he continued to fire at the police (Lt. Michael Ranshaw, Officers Conrado Torrez, John Caprarelli, and Ed Brentlinger) until his rifle jammed. Unable to clear the jam, he dropped the rifle and drew a Beretta 92FS pistol, which he began firing. He was then shot in the right hand by Officer Conrado Torrez, causing him to drop the pistol. After retrieving it, he placed the muzzle under his chin and fired. As he fell, Officer John Caprarelli shot him in the upper torso, severing his spine. Either bullet may have been fatal. Officers across the street continued to shoot Phillips' body several times while he was on the ground. After the firing had stopped, officers in the area surrounded Phillips, handcuffed him (though obviously deceased at this point, it was still standard procedure for police to arrest a criminal of his severity as if he were alive) and removed his ski mask.

Mătăsăreanu's vehicle was rendered inoperable after two of its tires were shot out and the windshield covered in bullet holes. At 9:56 a.m., he attempted to carjack a yellow 1963 Jeep Gladiator on Archwood by shooting at the driver, who fled on foot, three blocks east of where Phillips died. He quickly transferred all of his weapons and ammunition from the getaway car, but was unable to operate the Jeep due to the driver engaging the electrical kill switch before fleeing. As KCBS and KCAL helicopters hovered overhead, a patrol car driven by SWAT officers Donnie Anderson, Steve Gomez, and Richard Massa quickly arrived and stopped on the opposite side of the truck to where the Chevrolet was stopped. Mătăsăreanu left the truck, took cover behind the original getaway car, and engaged them in two-and-a-half minutes of almost uninterrupted gunfire. Mătăsăreanu's chest armor deflected a double tap from SWAT officer Anderson, which briefly winded him before he continued firing. Anderson fired his AR-15 below the cars and wounded Mătăsăreanu in his unprotected lower legs; he was soon unable to continue and put his hands up to show surrender.

Seconds after Mătăsăreanu's capitulation, officers rushed him to pin him down. As he was being cuffed, SWAT officers asked for his name, to which he replied "Pete". When asked if there were any more suspects, he reportedly said, "Fuck you! Shoot me in the head!"

Ambulance personnel were following standard procedure in hostile situations by refusing to enter "the hot zone", as the area was not cleared and Mătăsăreanu was still considered to be dangerous. The police radioed for an ambulance, but Mătăsăreanu, loudly swearing profusely and still goading the police to shoot him, died before the ambulance and EMTs were allowed to reach the scene almost 70 minutes later. During a later lawsuit against retired policemen John Futrell and James Vojtecky and the city, jurors heard testimony that involved an ambulance crew that arrived but left without Mătăsăreanu after Vojtecky allegedly told the crew to "get the (expletive) out of here." During the trial, Vojtecky testified he said something similar. The ambulance driver testified he believed he was in danger by being in the area. The officers testified they tried to get the ambulance to come back or to get another one, but the plaintiffs focused on a point at which Futrell canceled an ambulance call and told the dispatcher, "I have no officers or citizens down, only a suspect." Later reports showed that Mătăsăreanu had been shot 29 times in the legs and died from trauma due to excessive blood loss from two gunshot wounds in his left thigh.

Most of the incident, including the death of Phillips and surrender of Mătăsăreanu, was broadcast live by news helicopters, which hovered over the scene and televised the action as events unfolded. Over 300 law enforcement officers from various forces had responded to the citywide tactical alert. By the time the shooting had stopped, Phillips and Mătăsăreanu had fired about 1,100 rounds, approximately a round every two seconds.

Weapons and armor

An inventory of the weapons used:
 A Bushmaster XM-15 converted illegally to fire full auto with two 100-round Beta Magazines
 A Heckler & Koch HK-91 semi automatic rifle with several 30-round magazines
 A Beretta 92FS Inox with several magazines
 Three different civilian-model Kalashnikov-style rifles converted illegally to fire full auto with several 75- to 100-round drum magazines, as well as 30-round box magazines.

It was speculated during news reports that Phillips had legally purchased two of the Norinco Type 56s and then illegally converted them to full automatic. However, as Phillips was a convicted felon it was not possible for him to legally purchase firearms.

The two well-armored men had fired approximately 1,100 rounds, while approximately 650 rounds were fired by police. Following their training, the responding patrol officers directed their fire at the "center of mass", or torsos, of Mătăsăreanu and Phillips. However, aramid body armor worn by Phillips and Mătăsăreanu covered all of their vitals (except their heads), enabling them to absorb pistol bullets and shotgun pellets, while Mătăsăreanu's chest armor, thanks to a steel armor plate, successfully withstood a hit from a SWAT officer's AR-15. The service pistols carried by the first responding officers were of insufficient power and used the wrong type of ammunition for penetrating even pistol rated soft body armor. Furthermore, the police were pinned down by fully automatic suppressive fire, making it difficult for them to execute the type of well-aimed return fire that would be required to attempt head shots. Phillips was shot 11 times, including his self-inflicted gunshot wound to the chin while Mătăsăreanu was shot 29 times.

Casualties 
Twelve police officers and eight civilians were injured and the two suspects died in the shootout.

Police Officers 

 Sergeant Larry "Dean" Haynes was hit in the left shoulder 
 Officer Martin Whitfield was shot and seriously wounded four times in the left arm, right femur and chest
 Officer Conrado Torrez was grazed in the right side of the neck
 Officer James Zboravan was shot twice and seriously wounded in the lower back, hip and thigh
 Detective William "John" Krulac was hit in the right ankle
 Detective Tracey Angeles was grazed in the stomach and buttock
 Officer Stuart Guy was hit twice in the right femur and right forearm
 Detective Earl Valladares was hit in the head by flying debris
 Officer Ed Brentlinger was hit by gunfire and by concrete fragments on his face and left forearm
 Officer William Lantz was hit in the right knee
 Officer John Goodman was hit by flying glass and shrapnel
 Officer David Grimes was injured in a traffic accident

Civilians 

 Mildred Nolte was struck across the face
 John Villigrana was struck across the head by the stock of an assault rifle
 Javier Orozco was struck across the face
 Barry Golding was hit by flying glass and shrapnel
 Tracy Fisher was hit in the left ankle
 Michael Horen was hit in the left side of the chest
 Jose Haro was hit by flying glass and shrapnel 
 William Marr was hit by glass and shrapnel fragments in the right arm, left temple and nose

Suspects 
Larry Phillips Jr. committed suicide via a gunshot to the head.
Emil Mătăsăreanu was shot 29 times in both legs and died from blood loss

Aftermath

The shootout contributed to motivating the arming of rank-and-file police officers in Los Angeles and nationwide with semi-automatic rifles.

The ineffectiveness of the standard small-caliber police pistols and shotguns in penetrating the robbers' body armor led to a trend in the United States toward arming selected police patrol officers, not just SWAT teams, with heavier firepower such as semi-automatic AR-15-style rifles. SWAT teams, whose close quarters battle weaponry usually consisted of submachine guns that fired pistol cartridges such as the Heckler & Koch MP5, began supplementing them with AR-15 rifles and carbines.

On April 17, 1997, police raided a house in Anaheim traced to Phillips and Mătăsăreanu. Among the items seized included incendiary 7.62×39mm ammunition, flak jackets and ballistic helmets, approximately $400,000 in stolen cash and various firearms. One particular firearm—a short-barreled AR-15 with an aftermarket red dot sight—was later released from evidence for use by a law enforcement agency.

Seven months after the incident, the Department of Defense gave 600 surplus M16 rifles to the LAPD, which were issued to each patrol sergeant; LAPD patrol vehicles began carrying AR-15s as standard issue, with bullet-resistant Kevlar plating in their doors as well. Also as a result of this incident LAPD authorized its officers to carry .45 ACP caliber semi-automatic pistols as duty sidearms, specifically the Smith & Wesson Models 4506 and 4566. Prior to 1997, only LAPD SWAT officers were authorized to carry .45 ACP caliber pistols, specifically the M1911A1 .45 ACP semi-automatic pistol.

On June 12, 1998, LAPD Chief of Police Bernard C. Parks released to the Board of Police Commissioners a memorandum detailing his review of officers' use of force during the February 28, 1997 North Hollywood shootout. The memorandum contains many details about the shootout including badge numbers of officers and detectives, where they positioned themselves in the perimeter around the robbers with distances of fire, and how many rounds they fired from their weapons. Parks commended department personnel for their actions to "distract" the robbers and "obstruct" the robbers from attempting to evade police. The memorandum lists the injuries of all officers who received injuries at the hands of the robbers.

A lawsuit on behalf of Mătăsăreanu's children was filed by lawyer Stephen Yagman against members of the LAPD (Detective James Vojtecky and Officer John Futrell), claiming Mătăsăreanu's civil rights had been violated and that he was allowed to bleed to death. The lawsuit was tried in United States District Court in February and March 2000, and ended in a mistrial with a hung jury. The suit was later dropped when Mătăsăreanu's family agreed to dismiss the action with a waiver of malicious prosecution.

The year following the shootout, 18 officers of the LAPD received the departmental Medal of Valor for their actions, and met President Bill Clinton. In 2003, a film about the incident was produced, titled 44 Minutes: The North Hollywood Shoot-Out. In 2004, the Los Angeles Police Museum in Highland Park opened an exhibit featuring two life-size mannequins of Phillips and Mătăsăreanu fitted with similar armor and clothing they wore, and weaponry they used. Also on display at the museum is the robbers' getaway car and Officer Martin Whitfield's LAPD squad car.

See also

 211 – 2018 York Shackleton film loosely based on this event, starring Nicolas Cage
 44 Minutes: The North Hollywood Shoot-Out – 2003 made-for-television film about this event
 "44 Minutes" – song by American metal band Megadeth based on this event
Grand Theft Auto V – 2013 video game containing a mission, "The Paleto Score", possibly based on this event. 
 Casefile True Crime Podcast – Case 18: The North Hollywood Shootout
 1986 FBI Miami shootout
 List of homicides in California
 Newhall incident
 Norco shootout
 2022 Saanich shootout
 S.W.A.T. – 2003 film starring Colin Farrell and Samuel L. Jackson. The opening scene of a bank robbery in North Hollywood is loosely based on this event.

References

Sources

 
 
 
 
 
 
  .
 
 
 
  .

External links 
  
 Casefile True Crime Podcast – Case 18: The North Hollywood Shootout – 7 May 2016
 The North Hollywood Shootout – Google Earth placemarks for the North Hollywood Shooting. (Requires Google Earth)
 "Shoot-Out in North Hollywood: Command and Communications" by Nancy J. Rigg (focusing on dispatch and command post coordination), 9-1-1 Magazine
 27 minutes of helicopter footage of the shootout from the LA News Archive

1997 crimes in the United States
American bank robbers
Attacks in the United States in 1997
Bank of America
Bank robberies
Deaths by firearm in California
February 1997 crimes
Filmed killings by law enforcement
Filmed suicides
Law enforcement operations in the United States
Los Angeles Police Department
North Hollywood, Los Angeles
Robberies in the United States
San Fernando Valley
Spree shootings in the United States